Andy McEvoy (15 July 1938 – 7 May 1994 in Bray) was an Irish professional football player.

A native of Dublin, Andy McEvoy played for Bray Wanderers before joining Blackburn Rovers in October 1956.

He marked his English First Division debut by scoring twice against Luton Town in 1959 and two years later made his debut for the Republic of Ireland national football team against Scotland.

McEvoy didn't play in Blackburn's FA Cup final defeat by Wolves in 1960.

In the 1963–64 season, he was the First Division's second joint leading scorer with 32 goals and at the end of the 1964-65 campaign he shared the same title with Jimmy Greaves with 29 goals.

Blackburn were relegated in 1966 and after one season in Division Two, he returned to Ireland to join Limerick F.C. and won an FAI Cup medal with them in 1971.

He won his 17th and last cap for the Republic of Ireland against Czechoslovakia in 1967 and scored six goals for his country.

Later he managed Bray Wanderers and played a major role in the club's accession to the League of Ireland.

Andy McEvoy died at the age of 55.

International appearances and goals 

Andy McEvoy international appearances and goals

Honours 
FAI Cup
 Limerick F.C. 1971

References 

Andy McEvoy, Post War English & Scottish Football League A - Z Player's Transfer Database
Andy McEvoy & Republic of Ireland, Matches played and goals scored for the Republic of Ireland senior football team

1938 births
Association footballers from Dublin (city)
Republic of Ireland association footballers
Association football forwards
Republic of Ireland international footballers
Shamrock Rovers F.C. players
Limerick F.C. players
League of Ireland players
Blackburn Rovers F.C. players
1994 deaths
Place of death missing
English Football League players
First Division/Premier League top scorers
Bray Wanderers F.C. players
League of Ireland XI players